Ariginya Festival is a commonly celebrated festival celebrated in one of the Ondo State town called Ikare Akoko. Depending on the dialect and mode of pronunciation, some call it Aringinya. This festival is said to be one of the foremost traditional festival celebrated in this town from inception. Ikare-Akoko is one of the town located in the southwest region of Nigeria, and in the Yoruba area. The festival is one out of many festivals that is set to celebrate the virginity and chastity among female genders as the Yoruba land is known for her worth and high value pertaining to decency and purity. The festival is such that helps to improve the mindset of dignity and purity as well as the value of a woman staying pure and reserved until the wedding and only to her husband. This has helped to improve the rate of decency in the town as young girls understands the price and the worth and that one of the greatest virtue of a woman is her virginity and a media to stand against sexual abuse and harassment

.Thank you

History 
Knowing from history through books, story and other records of how princes migrated from ile-ife to settle in various locations and found different towns and cities that we have existing today, Ikare-Akoko wasn't left out. Ikare-Akoko was also, said to be founded by a Prince who migrated from Ile-Ife with the name Owa Ale Agbaode. He was one of the Oduduwa grand children. His settlement in Ikare was as a result of the instruction given by Ifa(one of the Yoruba gods), on getting to Ikare he settled at a place now called ''Oke iba'' that is sited behind a hill and a brook called the ''omi Atan'' that does not run dry even in dry seasons.

This water is said to be a supernatural water as it abore a goddess. The goddess named Ariginya appears to the people of the land and blesses the people yearly at the month of May. Therefore, the community reserved this period when then the goddess visit as a festive period, and since the appearance of the goddess as described by the people showcase purity, the festive season became a period to celebrate purity of womanhood and any young woman who has lost her virginity is not allowed to move close to the brook. Though Aringinya is a festival celebrated by the whole community, it is said that only the true maiden of the land that participate in the festival.

The goddess is known as the goddess of chastity, fruitfulness, and harvest. The festival is celebrated prior to planting season and it is said that it is a taboo for rain to fall during this festive period, and if such happens it is an indication that one or more of the maiden that has gone to the brook has lost her virginity and this will lead to the consultation of the Ifa priest to bring out the offender.

Festivity 
It is said that the Ariginya festival is a week festival celebrated prior to planting season as it a means of procuring the blessing of the goddess for fruitfulness, harvest, and chastity. During the festive period, only the young maiden (virgin) can participate in the festival as pertaining visiting the omi Atan. Most girls that visit the brook are naked as only there waist bead is left with tattoos drawn on there faces and bodies drawn with chalks and white lime, they march to the brooks as they do there traditional dances while sounds of drums, gong and other traditional musical instrument are heard. The males help to clear there path to the brook as well as to clean it. After, a while the goddess will come out of the river and bless the maidens and the community and married women who are seeking for the fruit of the womb will now step out to receive the blessing of fruitfulness from the goddess. Post this activity, the masquerade called igede-oka appears and display different styles.

At the end of the activities the community will march and dance to the palace and receive blessing from the crown king.

References 

Festivals in Nigeria